First We Eat is a Canadian documentary film, directed by Suzanne Crocker and released in 2020. The film documents the attempts of Crocker and her family, after a landslide temporarily blocked highway access to their hometown of Dawson City, Yukon, to spend a full year exclusively consuming food that had been hunted, fished, gathered, grown or raised locally, while carefully considering the environmental and social impacts of modern commercial transport of food. The documentary film premiered on May 28, 2020 on Hot Docs.

Production
Crocker first announced the project in 2017. The film's production website also incorporates an ongoing collaborative project on food security, including guides to foraging for edible wild plants, a seed guide to fruits and vegetables that grow well in Yukon, and a recipe guide to dishes that can be cooked with local ingredients available in the Dawson City area.

Release
The film premiered as part of the 2020 Hot Docs Canadian International Documentary Festival. Due to the COVID-19 pandemic in Canada it was not screened theatrically, but premiered as part of the festival's online streaming component. It was named one of five winners of the festival's Rogers Audience Award, alongside the films The Walrus and the Whistleblower, 9/11 Kids, The Forbidden Reel and There's No Place Like This Place, Anyplace.

It was opening film at 18th EBS International Documentary Film Festival held from 23 to 28 August 2021 in Seoul, South Korea. It was screened on August 23, 2021.

References

External links

2020 films
2020 documentary films
Canadian documentary films
Films shot in Yukon
Documentary films about food and drink
2020s English-language films
2020s Canadian films